Gang Star may refer to:

Gang Starr, an American hip hop group
Gangstar, a video game series
Gangstars, an Indian TV series
Gang Starz, a Malaysian reality show
The Gang Stars, a professional wrestling tag team better known as Cryme Tyme